The 2005 Orlando Predators season was the 15th season for the franchise. They went 10-6 and lost in the National Conference Finals to the Georgia Force.

Regular season

Schedule

Playoffs

References

External links
2005 Orlando Predators at ArenaFan.com

2005 Arena Football League season
Orlando Predators seasons
2005 in sports in Florida
2000s in Orlando, Florida